Eugenio Fuentes (born 1958 in Montehermoso, Cáceres), 
is an acclaimed Spanish novelist. Four of his novels have been translated into English, the crime novels The Depths of the Forest, The Blood of the Angels, The Pianist's Hands and At Close Quarters all published by Arcadia.

Bibliography

Novels
Las batallas de Breda (1990)
El nacimiento de Cupido (Premio Internacional de novela de Ciudad de San Fernando Luis Berenguer, 1993)
Tantas mentiras (Premio de Novela Extremadura, 1997)
El interior del bosque (1999); published in English as The depths of the forest
La sangre de los angeles (2001); published in English as The blood of the angels
Las manos del pianista (2003); published in English as The pianist's hands
Venas de nieve (2005)
Cuerpo a cuerpo (2007); published in English as At Close Quarters
Contrarreloj (2009)

Short stories
Vías muertas (1997).

External links
English Publisher's author page
Spanish publisher's author page, with a picture of the author

1958 births
Living people
People from Vegas del Alagón
Spanish novelists
Spanish male novelists
Spanish crime fiction writers